Mindflayer is a noise rock band from Providence, Rhode Island, made up of Brian Chippendale (of Lightning Bolt) and Mat Brinkmann (of Forcefield) which was formed out of Fort Thunder.

Much of Mindflayer's identity, including the band name, are obscure Dungeons & Dragons references.  The name of the band refers to psionic creatures in the Dungeons & Dragons universe, Illithids, commonly referred to as "mind flayers."  The covers of Take Your Skin Off and Die & Mold Services also resemble the Illithid's squid-like faces.  The title to the band's fourth album, Expedition to the Hairier Peaks, plays on the popular Dungeons & Dragons module title, Expedition to the Barrier Peaks. Mat Brinkman uses a circuit bent analog synthesizer.

Discography

Self-released
 Raise Your Tentacles and Yell! (released on official website) (2000)
 Live CD-R (released on official website) (Bulb) (2000/2001)
 Ape S**t C 90 2004

Studio albums
 It's Always 1999 (Ooo Mau Mau/Load) (2001/2004)
 Take Your Skin Off (Bulb) (2003)
 Die & Mold Services (Corleone) (2004)
 Expedition to the Hairier Peaks (Corleone) (2005)

7-inch singles
 Split (with Prurient) (Important Records) (2007)
 Split (with Deep Jew) (Not Not Fun Records) (2008)

Appearances on compilations
 Old Tyme Lemonade'' compilation (Hospital Productions) (2004)

References

External links 
Mindflayer on Myspace
 Load Records website
 Corleone Records website
 Bulb Records website
 PUNKCAST#262 Live video @ Luxx - Brooklyn, Apr 13 2003. (RealPlayer)

American noise rock music groups
Load Records artists